The 101st Brigade for the Protection of the General Staff named after Colonel-General Henadii Vorobiov is a headquarters area protection brigade of the Ukrainian Armed Forces. The brigade was formed in 1992 from the Soviet Protection and Service Battalion, responsible for guarding the Kyiv Military District headquarters during the later years of the Soviet Union. The brigade fought in the Russo-Ukrainian War.

History 
In the last years of the Soviet Union the 368th Battalion of Protection and Service guarded and supported the headquarters of the Kyiv Military District, stationed in the area of the Kyiv Military School. The 101st Brigade of the General Staff Armed Forces of Ukraine was established on 10 March 1992 on that battalion's basis. At the time the brigade consisted of: a battalion of guards, a guard of honor, the command and control center battalion, motor battalion and support units. The 2nd Protection Battalion was formed on 7 June 1995 and  the 3rd Protection Battalion on 11 September of the same year.  The soldiers of the brigade took part in the command and staff exercises "Forpost-2002", "East-West", "Reaction-2005", "Artery-2007", "Clean Sky", "The decisive action of 2008", "Interaction 2010 "" Adequate response 2011".

The brigade fought in the War in Donbas. The brigade entered the combat zone on 3 August 2014. The brigade defended Debaltseve and saw its first combat action on 15 August. Colonel Mykola Shvets commanded the brigade at the time. It escorted 300 convoys to the front and performed more than ten military intelligence extractions by February 2015. During its time in combat, eleven soldiers of the 101st Brigade were killed and 49 wounded. Eighteen soldiers of the brigade received either the Order of Bohdan Khmelnytsky or the Order For Courage.

On the occasion of the 30th Independence Day of Ukraine, in August 2021, the Ukrainian President Volodymyr Zelensky renamed the unit's name to honour the deceased First Deputy Chief of the General Staff of Ukraine Henadii Vorobiov.

During the 2022 Russian invasion of Ukraine, the 101st Brigade fought in the Battle of Kyiv, apparently destroying a column of two light vehicles, two trucks, and a tank.

See also 
 Independent Presidential Regiment (Ukraine)

Notes

References

Brigades of the Ukrainian Ground Forces
Military units and formations established in 1992
1992 establishments in Ukraine
Military units and formations of the 2022 Russian invasion of Ukraine